Eric Wilson is an American author, raised in Oregon, now living in Nashville, TN. He currently has twenty books in print, seventeen novels and three works of nonfiction, with more books on the way. His publishers range from Waterbrook Press (a division of Random House) to Thomas Nelson. His first book was published in 2004.

His works include Dark to Mortal Eyes, Expiration Date, The Best of Evil, and A Shred of Truth. The Best of Evil and A Shred of Truth are part of the Aramis Black mystery series. In addition, he has written a trilogy called "Jerusalem's Undead" which debuted with book one, Field of Blood, in 2008.  It was followed by Haunt of Jackals in Aug 2009, and Valley of Bones in May 2010. It is an ultra-modern take on Peretti's This Present Darkness and C.S. Lewis' The Screwtape Letters.

Wilson is also the writer of five movie novelizations.  The first two, Facing the Giants and Flywheel, had moderate success.  However, the third novelization, Fireproof, earned him a spot on the New York Times Bestseller list for 13 weeks. The fourth, October Baby, was released in 2012 and the fifth, Samson, came out in 2018.

Wilson released two suspense novels with Kingstone Media/Bay Forest Books, One Step Away and Two Seconds Late.

Wilson's nonfiction includes Taming the Beast: The Untold Story of Team Tyson, released in 2014, and in 2021, From Chains to Change, a memoir he co-wrote with Steven Allen Young, founder of Home Street Home Ministries. He has cowritten a book with Matt Bronleewe called Six Little Words: How One Simple Question Transformed Lives Around the World, slated for a late 2023 release, as well as one with his sister and brother called American Leftovers: Surviving Family, Religion, & the American Dream, to be released by Chalice Press in April 2023.

Wilson was born in California, spent some childhood years in 23 countries as a missionary kid, returning to Oregon where he finished high school. He earned a bachelor's degree in Biblical Studies from Life Pacific University in San Dimas, CA. He and his wife, songwriter Carolyn Rose, have two grown daughters and two grandchildren.

Works
Novels
Dark to Mortal Eyes (2004)
Expiration Date (2005)
The Best of Evil (2006)
A Shred of Truth (2007)
Facing the Giants (Novelization) (September 4, 2007)
Flywheel (Novelization) (April 2008)
Fireproof (Novelization) (September 2008)
Field of Blood (Jerusalem's Undead Trilogy #1) (Sept 2008)
Haunt of Jackals (Jerusalems's Undead Trilogy #2) (August 2009)
Valley of Bones (Jerusalems's Undead Trilogy #3) (April 2010)
One Step Away (By the Numbers #1) (October 2011)
Two Seconds Late (By the Numbers #2) (April 2012)
Three Fatal Blows (By the Numbers #3) (cancelled)
Amelia's Last Secret (June 2012)
October Baby (Novelization, with Theresa Preston) (September 2012)
Alice Goes the Way of the Maya (October 2012)
The Eagle's Nest (WWII thriller) (cancelled)
Taming the Beast: The Untold Story of Mike Tyson (co-writer Rory Holloway, October 2014)
Minutes Before Midnight (biography) (cancelled)
Samson (Novelization) (January 2018)
From Chains to Change (nonfiction, co-writer Steven Allen Young, 2021)

In progress
American Leftovers: Surviving Family, Religion, & the American Dream (co-writers, Heidi Wilson Messner and Shaun Paul Wilson, coming April 2023)
Confessions of a Former Prosecutor (coming early 2024)
Six Little Words: How One Simple Question Transformed Lives Around the World (co-writer, Matt Bronleewe, coming 2024)

References

3.   relevantmagazine.com/culture/books/man-wrote-book-version-samson-merged-fiction-bible/

External links
Official website

American thriller writers
American male novelists
Novelists from Oregon
Novelists from Tennessee
Writers from Nashville, Tennessee
21st-century American novelists
Living people
1966 births
21st-century American male writers